Carlisle Public Schools is a school district in Carlisle, Massachusetts, USA. The superintendent is Jim O'Shea. As of 2018. The district employed 79 faculty members and served 790 students in grades pre-K–8.

The district manages an elementary school and middle school collectively known as Carlisle Public School. The principal of the elementary school is Dennet Sidell and the principal of the middle school is Matt Mehler. The school was established in 1848 as a one-room school house.

References

External links 
 Official site
 http://www.carlislemosquito.org/index.php?option=com_content&view=article&id=2430/pages/new02front.html

School districts in Massachusetts
Education in Middlesex County, Massachusetts
School districts established in 1848
1848 establishments in Massachusetts